Peep, Peeps, or PEEP may refer to:

People
Peep (given name), Estonian masculine given name
Lil Peep (1996–2017), American singer and rapper
Helend Peep (1910–2007), Estonian actor
Viljar Peep (born 1969), Estonian historian and civil servant
People, or peeps, often referring to a certain group

Other uses
Peep (album), by Rasmus
Peeps, a type of candy
Peeps (novel), by Scott Westerfeld
Positive end-expiratory pressure, a measure of lung function
Stint, a type of bird
Peeps (Regular Show), an episode
Peep, a baby chick in the television series Peep and the Big Wide World

See also
Bo Peep (disambiguation)
Peeping (disambiguation)
Peeper (disambiguation)

Estonian-language surnames